Trata is a settlement in the Municipality of Škofja Loka in the Upper Carniola region of Slovenia.

Name
Trata was attested in historical sources as Tratarn in 1291 and as Traten before 1392. The place name Trata occurs several times in Slovenia. It is derived from the Slovene common noun trata 'small treeless meadow', which was borrowed from Middle High German trat 'meadow'.

Notable people
Notable people that were born or lived in Trata include:
 (1894–1953), composer and musicologist

References

External links

Trata at Geopedia

Populated places in the Municipality of Škofja Loka